Tracking Buffalo Through the Bathtub was the first studio album released by the rock n' roll jam band The Big Wu in 1997.  It was released at the Cabooze Bar in Minneapolis during CD Release party hosted by the band.

Track listing
  "Silcanturnitova"  – 3:45  
  "Kangaroo"  – 4:05
  "Midnight Rudy"  – 6:03
  "Bloodhound"  – 5:09
  "Puerto Rico"  – 5:51
  "Pinnacle  Listen Listen"  – 4:32
  "Precious Hands"  – 6:25
  "Gimme A Raise"  – 4:01
  "Take The World By Storm"  – 7:53
  "Red Sky"  – 8:61

References

1997 debut albums
The Big Wu albums